Hellat is a surname. Notable people with the surname include:

Aleksander Hellat (1881–1943), Estonian politician
Georg Hellat (1870–1943), Estonian architect